Alexander Zeldin (born 24 April 1985) is a British dramatist, author, and theatre director.

Career
Zeldin made work in Russia, South Korea and the Middle East as well as at the Naples Festival, before, between 2011-2014, developing a number of his own works as a teacher at East 15 Acting School, where he met several of the actors and creative team that collaborate with him today. At this time, he also worked as an assistant director to Peter Brook and Marie-Helene Estienne.

His critically acclaimed play, Beyond Caring, which told the story of several temporary workers meeting on a night shift in a meat factory, had its World Premiere at the Yard Theatre in Hackney in 2014, before transferring to the Temporary Theatre at the National Theatre in 2015.

In 2015 he was the recipient of the Quercus Trust Award and was appointed as Associate Director at Birmingham Repertory Theatre. Beyond Caring toured the UK and a new US production, re-developed for the US by Alexander and produced by Lookingglass Theater in conjunction with David Schwimmer’s company Dark Harbour Stories, opened in Chicago in April 2017.

His play Love opened at the National Theatre in December 2016, before transferring to Birmingham Rep. A  European tour took place in 2018  and Love has also been made into a film by the BBC and Cuba Pictures. In 2017, he was named Artist in Residence at the National Theatre and in 2018, was the winner of the Arts Foundation twenty-fifth anniversary Fellowship for Literature.

His most recent play, Faith Hope and Charity opened to widespread acclaim at the National Theatre in 2019, where he is now an Associate Director. From 2020, he is an Associate Artist of the Odéon Théâtre de L’Europe in Paris and one of the 2021 Visiting Artists at the Vienna Festwochen, where all three of his plays will be presented for the first time as THE INEQUALITIES

References

External links
 Curtisbrown.co.uk

British theatre directors
1985 births
Living people